Kornić  is a village on the island of Krk, Croatia.

References

Populated places in Primorje-Gorski Kotar County